Bjørnson Festival (Bjørnsonfestivalen) is an international literary festival held annually during August / September in Molde and Nesset, Norway.

The event is named in honor of the Nobel Prize in Literature laureate Bjørnstjerne Bjørnson who was raised in the area. The prime objective of the festival is to promote interest in literature and writing. The festival offers a  program  of seminars, art exhibitions and writing courses.

The Peace Grove (Fredslunden) is located next to the Royal Birch (Kongebjørka)  in Molde. It was founded by author and poet Knut Ødegård, president of the Bjornson festival in 1997. The Peace Grove stands as a reminder of the international struggle for freedom, peace and human dignity. Among those who have planted trees in the Peace Grove are visiting authors including  Wole Soyinka, Yasar Kemal, Vigdís Finnbogadóttir, Seamus Heaney, Amos Oz, Bei Dao, Hans Blix Qiu Xiaolong and Thor Heyerdahl.

See also
 Norwegian Festival of Literature

References

External links
The Bjørnson Festival

Molde
Literary festivals in Norway
Recurring events established in 1992
1992 establishments in Norway
Annual events in Norway